The 2000 Vuelta a Castilla y León was the 15th edition of the Vuelta a Castilla y León cycle race and was held on 31 July to 4 August 2000. The race started in Valladolid and finished in Bembibre. The race was won by Francisco Mancebo.

Teams
Fifteen teams of up to eight riders started the race:

 
 
 
 
 
 
 
 
 
 
 
 Palmans–Ideal
 
 
 Team Nürnberger

General classification

References

Vuelta a Castilla y León
Vuelta a Castilla y León by year
2000 in Spanish sport